Mahmoud Abdulaziz (16 October 1967 – 17 January 2013, Khartoum, Sudan) also transcribed as Mahmoud Abdel Aziz and affectionately known as Elhoot or Al-hoot (The Whale), was a popular Sudanese singer-songwriter. Called "Sudan's idol of the youth”, he was a central figure for Sudanese music fans, opposing the military government of the day.

Life and artistic career 
Mahmoud Abdulaziz was born in the Bahri district of Khartoum in 1967, and died in hospital in Amman in January 2013. His music was a blend of modern urban music from Sudan and Western pop music, with occasional other African influences. Even though his songs were banned on Sudan's national television and radio during the years of Sharia-inspired Public Order Laws, when many singers, artists and politicians had to flee the country, because of conservative religious intolerance against popular music, Abdulaziz stayed in Sudan and continued to perform, risking arrest.

At the time of his death, he had become a symbol for those wanting a more secular and less repressive Sudan. Abdulaziz recorded more than 30 albums, widely available in Sudan on cassette tapes or bootleg CDs. Several of the many YouTube videos with his music have more than one million views. An example for his great popularity is the attendance of several tens of thousands of his fans at the fourth anniversary of his death in Khartoum in January 2017.

Trivia 
During a concert, a disabled fan, who could not get as close to the stage as he would have wanted, sought to catch the attention of his idol, and started waving his hands. This worked, and Abdulaziz mimicked his movements, and also came to greet the fan. Later, it became habitual for the artist  to  greet his devoted fans in this way, at every concert.  Subsequently, crossed arms with index fingers pointing outwards became his symbol, and was in turn taken up by other fans. Even on his deathbed, Mahmoud was photographed in this pose.

Select Discography
Albums
 1994:  Khalli Balak
 1995:  Sakat Al-Rabab
 1996:  Jawab lilbalad
 1996:  Seb enadak
 2001:  qaed al istul
 2002:  Fi bali
 1998:  lahib alshoug
 2000: Noor Alain
 2000:  alaa alnajeela
 2000:  ma tishly ham
 2001:  ash man shafak
 2001:  bartah liek
 2002:  Shail Jarrah
 2002:  Aktubi eli
 2003:  adaat sanna
 2005:  marat alayam
 2005:  saab albalad
 2005:  Khof alwajaa
 2007:  Alhaneen
 2008:  ya zoul ya tieb

See also 

 Music of Sudan
 List of Sudanese singers

References

External links 
 Mahmoud Abdulaziz discography at Discogs
 YouTube mix list
 Facebook fan page
 Obituary in Arabic about Mahmoud Abdulaziz 

20th-century Sudanese male singers
1967 births
2013 deaths
21st-century Sudanese male singers